Arabs in Austria are Austrians of Arab ethnic, particularly Lebanon, Syria, Palestinian, Iraq, Jordan and also small groups from Egypt, Algeria, Tunisia, Morocco, Libya, Yemen and Sudan, who emigrated from their native nations and currently reside in Austria. Most Arab Austrians are of Iraqis and Lebanese or Syrian origin, as a result of the fact that they were the first Arabs to arrive in Austria.

In addition, Austria has people from Arab countries, who have the status of refugees (Refugees of the Syrian civil war) or illegal immigrants (Algerians of mainly Berber descent and usually mistakenly called Arabs) trying to immigrate to Western Europe.

Notable people
 Kerim Frei, footballer born to Turkish father and Moroccan mother
 Adnan Ibrahim, theologian and Muslim preacher of Palestinian origin
 Abdel Sattar Sabry, Football of Egyptian origin
 Tarafa Baghajati, activist and writer of Syrian origin
 Omar Hamdi, artist of Syrian-kurdish origin
 Alisar Ailabouni, fashion and model 
 Fadi Merza, kickboxing and Muay Thai of Syrian origin
 Nadja Maleh, Austrian actress, singer, cabaret artist and director.

See also

 Arab diaspora
Syrians in Austria
Immigration to Austria
Lebanese diaspora
Syrian diaspora
Palestinian diaspora
Moroccan diaspora
Iraqi diaspora
Egyptian diaspora
Tunisian diaspora

References

Ethnic groups in Austria
Islam in Austria
Austrian people of Arab descent
Arab diaspora in Europe
Middle Eastern diaspora in Austria
Muslim communities in Europe